Walter Schneider may refer to:

Walter Schneider (bass), German operatic bass
Walter Schneider (ice hockey), Austrian ice hockey player
Walter Schneider (motorcyclist) (1927–2010), German motorcyclist
Walter Schneider (swimmer), Swiss swimmer
Walter Schneider (aeronautical engineer), German aeronautical engineer
Walter-Erich Schneider (1909–1987), German military officer